The Family Code of Russia (abbreviated as СК РФ) is the prime source of family law in the Russian Federation. It was passed by the State Duma on 8 December 1995, signed into law by President Boris Yeltsin on 29 December 1995, and came into force on 1 March 1996. It has been amended a number of times since then, most recently in June 2008.

Structure of the Family Code
 Section I: General provisions
 Section II: Marriage and divorce
 Section III: The rights and duties of spouses
 Section IV: The rights and duties of parents and children
 Section V: Alimony duties of family members
 Section VI: Ways of raising children who are not under parental care
 Section VII: Application of family law to family relationships that include foreign citizens and stateless persons
 Section VIII: Concluding remarks

References

External links

  Current text of the Family Code of Russia

Law of Russia
Legal codes
Russia